Japanese resistance can refer to:
 Political dissidence in the Empire of Japan
 Dissent in the Armed Forces of the Empire of Japan
 Japanese in the Chinese resistance to the Empire of Japan
 Japanese People's Emancipation League
 Japanese People's Anti-war Alliance
 League to Raise the Political Consciousness of Japanese Troops
 Japanese holdouts, Japanese soldiers who continued fighting after Japan’s surrender in World War II
 Volunteer Fighting Corps, planned civil defence units